Anis-ur-Rehman (born 4 September 1970) is a Pakistani former first-class cricketer who played for Sargodha cricket team. He was also an umpire and stood in matches in the 2009 RBS Twenty-20 Cup.

References

External links
 

1970 births
Living people
Pakistani cricketers
Pakistani cricket umpires
Sargodha cricketers
Cricketers from Sargodha